"Pain Killer" (also titled "Pain Killer (Summer Rain)") is a song written by Olly Knights and Gale Paridjanian, produced by Tony Hoffer, and recorded by British band Turin Brakes. It was included on Turin Brakes' second album, Ether Song (2003), and was released as the second single from the album in February 2003. The song debuted at its peak of number five on the UK Singles Chart, at which point the single's formats were deleted. Outside the United Kingdom, the song charted in Italy and the Netherlands at numbers 50 and 64, respectively.

Track listings
UK CD single
 "Pain Killer (Summer Rain)" (radio edit) – 3:41
 "Where's My Army?" (home recording) – 2:32
 "Little Brother" (demo version) – 5:15
 "Pain Killer (Summer Rain)" (video) – 3:41

UK limited-edition 7-inch single
A. "Pain Killer" (radio edit)
B. "Little Brother" (demo version)

European limited-edition CD single
 "Pain Killer (Summer Rain)" (radio edit) – 3:41
 "Pain Killer (Summer Rain)" (video) – 3:41

Personnel
Personnel are lifted from the UK CD single liner notes.

 Olly Knights – vocals, writing
 Gale Paridjanian – vocals, writing
 Justin Meldal-Johnsen – bass
 Brian Reitzell – drums
 Dave Palmer – keyboards
 Tony Hoffer – production, mixing
 S. Husky Höskulds – engineering
 Ben Drury – Turin Brakes logo and sleeve artwork
 William Bankhead – sleeve photography
 Kate Nielsen – artwork coordination

Charts

Release history

References

2003 singles
2003 songs
Astralwerks singles
Music videos directed by David Slade
Song recordings produced by Tony Hoffer
Turin Brakes songs